Papaver hybridum, the rough poppy or round pricklyhead poppy, is a widespread species of flowering plant in the family Papaveraceae. It is native to the Mediterranean region, and western Asia as far as the western Himalayas, and has been introduced to much of the rest of Europe, South Africa, all of Australia, some US states, Chile and Argentina. It is a minor weed of cereal crops, and its range is expected to greatly expand due to climate change.

References 

hybridum
Flora of the Canary Islands
Flora of Madeira
Flora of North Africa
Flora of Southwestern Europe
Flora of Southeastern Europe
Flora of the Crimean Peninsula
Flora of the Caucasus
Flora of Western Asia
Flora of Saudi Arabia
Flora of Turkmenistan
Flora of Pakistan
Flora of West Himalaya
Plants described in 1753
Taxa named by Carl Linnaeus